Richard Huxtable (13 October 1890 – 29 August 1970) was a Welsh international rugby union wing who played club rugby for Swansea captaining the team during the 1921–22 season. He won two caps for Wales both during the 1920 Five Nations Championship.

Bibliography

References 

1890 births
1970 deaths
Swansea RFC players
Rugby union players from Swansea
Rugby union flankers
Wales international rugby union players